FOMT may refer to:

 Harvest_Moon:_Friends_of_Mineral_Town, a video game
 Tricetin 3',4',5'-O-trimethyltransferase, an enzyme